Groff may refer to:

 Groff (surname)
 groff (software), a typesetting computer program
 Groff (lychee), a variety of lychee fruit tree

See also 

 Graf (disambiguation)
 Graff (disambiguation)
 Grof (disambiguation)